John Titor and (TimeTravel_0) are pseudonyms used on the Time Travel Institute and Art Bell's Post-to-Post forums during 2000 and 2001 by a poster claiming to be an American military time traveler from 2036.  Titor made numerous vague and specific predictions regarding calamitous events in 2004 and beyond, including a nuclear war. Inconsistencies in his explanations, the uniform inaccuracy of his predictions, and a private investigator's findings all led to the general impression that the entire episode was an elaborate hoax. A 2009 investigation concluded that Titor was likely the creation of Larry Haber, a Florida entertainment lawyer, along with his brother John Rick Haber, a computer scientist.

Titor's posts 
The first posts using John Titor's military symbol appeared on the Time Travel Institute forums on November 2, 2000, under the name TimeTravel_0. At that time the name "John Titor" was not being used. The posts discussed time travel in general, the first one being the "six parts" description of what a time machine would need to have to work (see below) and responses to questions about how such a machine would work. Early messages tended to be short. A second thread was also made due to shortcomings in the forum software at the time.

The name "John Titor" was not introduced until January 2001, when TimeTravel_0 began posting at the Art Bell BBS Forums (which required a name or pseudonym for every account). The Titor posts ended in late March 2001.

Around 2003, various websites reproduced Titor's posts, re-arranging them into narratives. Not all refer to the original dates posted.

In his online postings, Titor claimed to be an American soldier from 2036, based in Tampa, Florida. He was assigned to a governmental time-travel project, and sent back to 1975 to retrieve an IBM 5100 computer, which he said was needed to debug various legacy computer programs in 2036 – a possible reference to the UNIX year 2038 problem. The IBM 5100 runs the APL and BASIC programming languages.

Titor said he had been selected for this mission specifically, given that his paternal grandfather was directly involved with the assembly and programming of the 5100.  In support of this, he described unpublicized features of the 5100, leading to assumptions that a computer scientist was behind the postings. Titor claimed to be on a stopover in the year 2000 for "personal reasons", to collect pictures lost in the (future) civil war and to visit his family, of whom he spoke often.

Titor also said he had been, for a few months, trying to alert anyone that would listen about the threat of Creutzfeldt–Jakob disease spread through beef products and about the possibility of civil war within the United States. When questioned about them by an online subscriber, Titor also expressed an interest in mysteries such as UFOs, which he claimed remained unexplained in his time. Titor suggested that UFOs and extraterrestrials might be travelers from much further into the future than his own time, with superior time machines.

Time machine 
Titor described his time machine on several occasions. In an early post, he described it as a "stationary mass, temporal displacement unit powered by two top-spin, dual positive singularities", producing a "standard off-set Tipler sinusoid".

The earliest post was more explicit, saying it contained the following:
 Two magnetic housing units for the dual micro singularities
 An electron injection manifold to alter mass and gravity of the micro singularities
 A cooling and X-ray venting system
 Gravity sensors, or a variable gravity lock
 Four main cesium clocks
 Three main computer units
According to the posts, the device was installed in the rear of a 1966 Chevrolet Corvette convertible. The posts later mentioned a 1987 truck with four-wheel drive.

Predictions 
Although invoking the many-worlds interpretation of quantum mechanics, whereby events from his timeline may differ from our own, Titor also expressed assurance that the differences were minimal.  As such, his descriptions have been interpreted as predictions and compared with historical events since 2001.

The most immediate of Titor's predictions were of an upcoming civil war in the United States having to do with "order and rights". He described it as beginning in 2005, with civil unrest surrounding the presidential election of that year. This civil conflict that he characterized as "having a Waco type event every month that steadily gets worse" would be "pretty much at everyone's doorstep" and erupt by 2008.

As a result of the war, the United States would split into five regions based on various factors and differing military objectives. This civil war, according to Titor, would end in 2015 with a brief but intense World War III.

Titor refers to the exchange as "N Day". Washington, D.C. and Jacksonville, Florida are specifically mentioned as being hit. After the war, Omaha, Nebraska would be the new U.S. capital. Titor was vague as to the exact motivations and causes for World War III. At one point, he characterized the hostilities as being led by "border clashes and overpopulation". He also pointed to the contemporary conflict between Arabs and Israel as not a cause, but rather a milestone that precedes a hypothetical World War III.

Titor claimed that as a 13-year-old in 2011, he joined the Fighting Diamondbacks, a shotgun infantry unit in Florida, for at least four years. In other posts, he described himself as hiding from the war.

Titor claimed that the "Everett–Wheeler model of quantum physics", better known as the many-worlds interpretation, was correct. According to Titor, this caused a new timestream to form because of his time travel.  This makes his predictions non-falsifiable, since believers can say that the events were averted by Titor's postings.

Criticism and discussion 
The New Republic called Titor the most famous of several internet forum posters who claimed to be time travelers.

An Italian television program, Voyager – Ai confini della conoscenza, aired the results of an investigation of John Titor on May 19, 2008. Private investigator Mike Lynch found no registry evidence, past or present, of any individual named John Titor. He did, however, identify the John Titor Foundation, a for-profit company formed on September 16, 2003, with no office or address other than a rented post box in Kissimmee, Florida. An IP address connected with Titor also geolocated to Kissimmee.

In 2009, a report by John Hughston of the Hoax Hunter website named Larry Haber, a Florida entertainment lawyer, as the CEO of the foundation. Lynch concluded that Larry Haber and his brother Richard, a computer scientist, were very likely the men behind John Titor, whom they actually introduced in 1998, accompanied by different predictions, including chaos due to the Y2K "bug". John Hughston also reported that John Titor is a trademark registered with the United States Patent and Trademark Office; the Titor trademark is now classified as "Abandoned".

In 2018, multimedia artist Joseph Matheny, creator of the alternate reality game Ong's Hat, said that he worked as a consultant for unnamed individuals responsible for the legend. John Titor "is a story that was created as a literary experiment by people who were observing what I was doing with Ong's Hat and these people wanted to do something like that. I was a consultant on the project, [but] it wasn't my project."

In popular culture 
 In 2003, the John Titor Foundation published a book, John Titor: A Time Traveler's Tale, discussing his claims; the book is now out of print.
 The 2009 visual novel Steins;Gate, which was adapted into an anime in 2011, heavily features time travel and has John Titor as a major part of the plot.
 In 2009, a docudrama was created about John Titor called Timetravel_0 directed by Scott Norwood.
 Titor was referenced in the shonen supernatural horror manga Magical Girl Apocalypse.
 In an issue of The Unbeatable Squirrel Girl, John Titor is listed in the Deadpool's Guide to Super Villains card set as an alias of Kang the Conqueror.

References

External links 

 The original John Titor thread on Time Travel Institute
 John Titor's second thread on Time Travel Institute
 John Titor IRC logs
 John Titor photos, faxes and general info

2036
Internet memes introduced in 2000
Unidentified people
Usenet people
Internet properties established in 2000
Fictional characters introduced in 2000
Time travelers
Urban legends